Safia Yusuf Abdi Haase (born 1959) is a Somali graduate nurse. She was trained at the Harstad University College in Harstad, Norway, and also has a Master's in International Welfare and Health Policy from the University of Oslo. Haase is an official with the Amathea Foundation, having joined the non-profit organization in 2005. In this capacity, she helped formulate the Norwegian government's national action plan against female genital mutilation (FGM) and serves as an ambassador against gender-based violence. Haase is also part of the KIM national board, which works toward inter-cultural understanding, acceptance and protection. Additionally, she is a member of the Global Core Team of the Human Dignity and Humiliation Studies interdisciplinary network of academics and practitioners. Haase has received various awards and recognition for her work, including the 1999 Harstad Honorary Ambassador, Harstad Savings Banks Culture Prize 2000, Troms County Council Equality Award 2001, Unni and Jon Dørsjøs Memorial Fund at the Norwegian Women's Public Health Association in 2005, Honorary Member of the Norwegian Women's Public Health Association in 2005, 2005 Africa Forum – Nordic, Top 10 Annual Award in 2007, and the 2007 Reconciliation Prize/Blanche Major. In 2014, she was also presented Norway's Order of St. Olav, the first immigrant woman to receive the honour.

References

1959 births
Living people
Ethnic Somali people
Somalian activists
Somalian women activists
Somalian emigrants to Norway
University of Oslo alumni